Instituto Rosedal Vista Hermosa is a private school in Col. Lomas de Vista Hermosa, Cuajimalpa, Mexico City. Its first educational stage is kindergarten the Instituto Rosedal Kinder Oakhill, and it goes up to bachillerato (senior high school).

It is affiliated with Instituto Cumbres México and Oakhill Preschool México.

References

External links
 Instituto Rosedal Vista Hermosa 

High schools in Mexico City
Cuajimalpa
Private schools in Mexico